{{DISPLAYTITLE:C12H15FN2}}
The molecular formula C12H15FN2 (molar mass: 206.259 g/mol, exact mass: 206.1219 u) may refer to:

 5-Fluoro-DMT (5-Fluoro-N,N-dimethyltryptamine)
 6-Fluoro-DMT (6-Fluoro-N,N-dimethyltryptamine)